Buriti de Vassununga Area of Relevant Ecological Interest is an area of relevant ecological interest, a sustainable use protected area, in the state of São Paulo, Brazil.

Location

It is near the Cerrado Pé de Gigante Area of Relevant Ecological Interest.
It was created by decree 99.276 of 6 June 1990 and is administered at the federal level by the Chico Mendes Institute for Biodiversity Conservation (ICMBio).

Conservation

Vassununga is classed as IUCN protected area category IV (habitat/species management area), with the objective of maintaining natural ecosystems of regional or local importance and regulating permissible use of these areas to make it compatible with the objectives of conserving nature.
Activities that might damage the environment are banned, including competitive sports, overgrazing, harvesting of natural products, installation of industries, construction of buildings, any activities that prevent regeneration of natural plants, soil erosion or silting of waterways, and any activities that may jeopardise the integrity of the ecosystems and harmony of the landscape.

The public agencies of the state of São Paulo may monitor compliance, but the Brazilian Institute of Environment and Renewable Natural Resources (IBAMA) retains the right to supplementary action.

Notes

Sources

1990 establishments in Brazil
Areas of relevant ecological interest of Brazil
Protected areas of São Paulo (state)